Condica conducta is a moth of the family Noctuidae described by Francis Walker in 1857. It has a wide range and occurs in Africa (including South Africa, Congo, Madagascar and Réunion) as well as in Hong Kong, Fiji, the Society Islands and the Chagos Archipelago.

Larvae have been recorded on Senecio species.

External links

Condicinae
Moths of Cape Verde
Moths of the Comoros
Moths of Africa
Moths of Fiji
Moths of Madagascar
Moths of Réunion
Moths of Seychelles
Moths of the Middle East
Moths described in 1857